INS Pamba is a self-propelled water carrier barge built by Vipul Shipyard Ltd (a subsidiary of ABG Shipyard Ltd) in Surat, Gujarat for the Indian Navy.

Description
Pamba has accommodation for 20 crew members and a galley or corridor kitchen facility. It has tank gauging systems, fire fighting equipment and carries a rigid inflatable boat. It has sea-going capability and carries all essential communication and navigation equipment.

It is named after a previous auxiliary vessel of same name which served the Indian Navy for nearly four decades and was decommissioned in April 2007. Pamba (IR no. 38186) is one of the five water barges built by Vipul Shipyard as per the contract concluded in February 2006.  INS Ambuda (IR no. 35823) and INS Pulakesin-1  (IR no:40373) are her sister ships which were commissioned  11 October 2010 and 21 September 2011 respectively.

Commission
Pamba was commissioned  by Commodore S. Nedunchezian, Chief Staff Officer (Technical), Southern Naval Command at South Jetty, Kochi Naval Base, on 29 March 2011.

See also

Arga Class Tugboat

External links
http://www.sainiksamachar.nic.in/englisharchives/2011/apr16-11/h4.htm

References 

Auxiliary ships of the Indian Navy
2011 ships